Meall Ghaordaidh is a mountain in the Southern Highlands of Scotland, approximately 10 km north-west of Killin.

The mountain can be ascended via Glen Lochay starting to the north-west of the Allt Dhùin Croisg near Duncroisk, via an eroded path leading north-west through peat bogs to the summit; alternatively, an ascent can be made from Glen Lyon starting at Stronuich via one of two spurs that lead to the summit (Creag an Tulabhain or Creag Laoghain). The summit is marked by a large circular rock windbreak, within which there is a trig point.

References

Munros
Marilyns of Scotland
Mountains and hills of the Southern Highlands
Mountains and hills of Stirling (council area)
One-thousanders of Scotland